Antonsdóttir is an Icelandic patronymic name.  People known by this name include the following:

Harpa Karen Antonsdóttir (born 1999), Icelandic football player
Hildur Antonsdóttir (born 1995), Icelandic footballer 
Kristrún Rut Antonsdóttir (born 1994), Icelandic multi-sport athlete

See also

Icelandic-language surnames